The Metropolitan Region Scheme (MRS) provides the legal basis for land use planning within the Perth metropolitan region. It classifies land into broad zones and reservations and is administered by the Western Australian Planning Commission. It is one of three regional schemes in Western Australia. The MRS is updated via an ongoing process of amendments. Amendments to the MRS are typically informed by a series of strategic plans prepared by the Department of Planning, Lands and Heritage. Detailed land use planning within the area of the MRS is undertaken by local governments and other statutory authorities which prepare one or more local planning schemes within their administrative boundaries. Local plannings schemes must be consistent with the MRS and require the approval of the WAPC. The acquisition of land reserved under the MRS is funded by a hypothecated land tax called the Metropolitan Region Improvement Tax.

Background 
The MRS derived from Hepburn and Stephenson's 1955 Plan for the Metropolitan Region, Perth and Fremantle and has been in operation since 1963.  Hepburn and Stephenson were commissioned by the Government of Western Australia to develop the plan in 1953. The completed report recommended that a regional planning authority be established for the purpose of implementing a regional planning scheme—a recommendation that was passed into law with the MRTPS Act of 1959. The Act centralised sub-division control, keeping it in the hands of the state government, but delegated many local planning responsibilities to local governments.

Since 1963 the MRS has been continuously updated via a series of amendments which change the zoning or reservation of land to allow for a different land use. These amendments are typically informed by regional strategies prepared on a periodic basis, commencing with the 1955 Plan, followed by the Corridor Plan in 1970, the Metroplan of 1990 and Directions 2031 in 2010.

In 2006 the Planning and Development Act 2005 superseded the MRTPS Act 1959 and allowed for the creation of new region schemes outside the metropolitan area.

Metropolitan Region Improvement Tax 

The MRTS is a special purpose tax recommended by Gordon Stephenson's report, and introduced in 1959. The MRS is funded by a levy on taxable land value above $300,000 excluding primary residences. This tax is collected by the Department of Finance but falls wholly under the control of the WAPC. The tax funds the acquisition of land reserves under the scheme for public purposes including public open space, road and railway reserves and environmental conservation.

One estimate calculates that MRTS has funded more than $1 billion of land acquisitions since 1963 (unadjusted for inflation).

The MRTIS applies only to the MRS area and has not been extended to the Peel Region Scheme or Greater Bunbury Scheme areas. Land acquisition under these schemes is funded by annual grants from the state budget.

See also 
Melbourne Planning Scheme
Sydney Region Outline Plan

References

Perth, Western Australia
Government of Western Australia
Urban planning in Australia